The Boswell Wilkie Circus was in business for close to 75 years in South Africa.

Circus origins
The Boswell family started the show in 1913 in Vrededorp, a Johannesburg suburb. The family did most of the entertainment. Jim, Walter and Alf did tumbling acts while Walter and Alf were clowns. Jim leaped from the springboard over ten ponies and they showed ponies, donkeys and dogs. It was one of the first shows to allow racially mixed audiences and it became a staple in South Africa. It was one of the first to defy the apartheid government's ban on Sunday entertainment. Wilkie's daughter Susie began performing when she was three and her brother, Robert, was the youngest person to become a circus director and manager.

First World War
During the First World War, the circus didn't perform much. From 1916 and after, the Boswells became known as the Boswell Brothers Circus and Menagerie, and they would eventually be called just the Boswell's Circus.

Between the wars

In 1919, the Boswells had their first show since the war in Durban. The Boswells started to put effort into enlarging their circus. The first Asian elephant was bought in 1921 from Frank Willison, an American who had a circus in Madagascar. Jim also started training his first lion group. In 1924 Boswell’s Circus undertook a tour that took them through Southern and Northern Rhodesia (now Zimbabwe and Zambia), Mozambique, and up into the Belgian Congo for the first time. In 1932, during the worldwide recession, the Boswells held special charity performances in Durban. They gave a show in aid of the unemployed with the patronage of the Governor-General and the Countess of Clarendon. They also allowed unemployed people to sleep in the tent and they put on a performance for 1000 poor children and the elderly.

Second World War
In 1941 there was great interest in the 21-year-old Helen Ayres of Pretoria. She handled the lions with great courage. She was the wife of Stanley, having married him in 1939. Three of the four original Boswell brothers retired in 1942.

After the war
In 1953, the Boswell family entered into an agreement with the African Consolidated Theatres Organization. In November 1963, Jim and Syd Boswell sold the rest of their shares to the African Theatres. The terms of the settlement included that it would now be known as the Boswell-Wilkie Circus.

Circus closing
The Boswell Wilkie Circus had its final show in October 2001. After difficult economic times in South Africa, the circus announced that the touring side would stop. Their final performance was on 13 October in Alberton, Gauteng. The circus then moved to Randvaal. The circus continued to perform just for corporate functions and Christmas parties.

Taking down of the Big Top Tent at Randvaal

The below is a post from their website as a last good bye:
It is with great sadness that the Wilkie family have to announce that after many years of the Big top standing on the Boswell Wilkie Circus farm in Randvaal, the beloved Big Top, that holds so many precious memories for those young and old, will be taken down on 10 December 2015.

This 38m x 38m big top was sold to McLaren Circus, who currently tours as Africa’s only traditional travelling circus.

After years under the hot South African sun, the circus Big Top has seen its last days in the spotlight and will unfortunately be retiring. The family have made the difficult decision not to replace the Big Top, which means that they will no longer have circus participation parties and school outings. We will, however, continue to host parties in the beautiful gardens of Café du Cirque, as well as in our newly renovated rustic stables venue, where the kiddies can enjoy the jungle gym, pony rides or perhaps even a clown. We do have a few tricks up our sleeves and we are currently working on a new project for children’s parties. Updates will be posted on the Café du Cirque Facebook page.

The Wilkies are still, however, keeping the circus alive, and have a vast variety of performers available for private and corporate events.

We encourage you all to come and say your nostalgic goodbyes and take your last photographs with our beautiful Italian Big Top. We are open Tuesdays – Fridays from 10h00 to 17h00, and Saturdays, Sundays and public holidays from 08h00 to 17h00.

References

Circuses